Adobe Premiere Pro is a timeline-based and non-linear video editing software application (NLE) developed by Adobe Inc. and published as part of the Adobe Creative Cloud  licensing program. First launched in 2003, Adobe Premiere Pro is a successor of Adobe Premiere (first launched in 1991). It is geared towards professional video editing, while its sibling, Adobe Premiere Elements, targets the consumer market.

CNN was an early adopter of Adobe Premiere Pro. Also, in 2007, certain BBC departments adopted Premiere Pro. It has been used to edit feature films, such as Deadpool, Gone Girl, Captain Abu Raed, Terminator: Dark Fate, Monsters, and the 2022 Academy Award Best Picture winner Everything Everywhere All At Once, and other venues such as Madonna's Confessions Tour.

Adobe Premiere Pro is a video editing software application that is widely used by professionals in the film, television, and video content creation industry. It is part of the Adobe Creative Cloud suite of applications, which also includes Photoshop, After Effects, and Audition, among others. Premiere Pro offers a wide range of tools for video editing, including advanced features for color correction, audio editing, visual effects, and motion graphics.

History

Original Adobe Premiere

The original version of Adobe Premiere was developed by Adobe Systems. It was first launched in 1991, and its final version was released in 2002.

Premiere was one of the first computer non-linear editing systems. The first version for Mac released in 1991, and the first version for Microsoft Windows was released in September 1993. The project began at SuperMac Technology as ReelTime, a QuickTime-based video editor for its VideoSpigot video capture card. SuperMac engineer Randy Ubillos created a working demo of ReelTime in about 10 weeks while QuickTime was still in beta. The software project was acquired by Adobe Systems in August 1991 and was renamed Adobe Premiere. Ubillos also left SuperMac to join Adobe.

Premiere was one of the first QuickTime-based video editors on the market. As a result, its ability to import new video formats could also be upgraded by updating to a newer compatible version of Quicktime. However, it was limited to processing video and images that were 1024 pixels wide, or less.

Premiere included 24 transition effects and a plug-in architecture that was compatible with some Photoshop filters.

Release of Adobe Premiere Pro
It was replaced by Adobe Premiere Pro (introduced in 2003), a rewritten version of Adobe Premiere.
Premiere Pro is the successor to Adobe Premiere and was launched in 2003. Premiere Pro refers to versions released in 2003 and later, whereas Premiere refers to the earlier releases. Premiere was based on ReelTime, a product acquired from SuperMac Technologies Inc. and was one of the first computer-based NLEs (non-linear editing system), with its first release on Mac in 1991. Adobe briefly abandoned the Mac platform after version 6 of Premiere. Up until version Premiere Pro 2.0 (CS2), the software packaging featured a galloping horse, in a nod to Eadweard Muybridge's work, "Sallie Gardner at a Gallop".

Features 
Premiere Pro supports high resolution video editing at up to 10,240 × 8,192 resolution, at up to 32 bits per channel color, in both RGB and YUV.  Audio sample-level editing, VST audio plug-in support, and 5.1 surround sound mixing are available.  Premiere Pro's plug-in architecture enables it to import and export formats beyond those supported by QuickTime or DirectShow, supporting a wide variety of video and audio file formats and codecs on both MacOS and Windows.  When used with CineForm's Neo line of plug-ins, it supports 3D editing with the ability to view 3D material using 2D monitors, while making individual left and right eye adjustments.

Premiere Pro can be used for all common video editing tasks necessary for producing broadcast-quality, high-definition video. It can be used to import video, audio and graphics, and is used to create new, edited versions of video which can be exported to the medium and format necessary for the distribution. When creating videos using Premiere Pro, various videos, still images and audio files can be edited together. Titles and motion graphics can be added to videos and filters can be applied along with other effects.

Premiere Pro was very well received at launch in the film and video industry, seeing use in films such as Superman Returns, Dust to Glory (for video capture processing), and also in places such as Madonna's Confessions Tour.

Workflow integration 
 After Effects
 Through Adobe Dynamic Link, compositions from Adobe After Effects may be imported and played back directly on the Premiere Pro timeline.  The After Effects composition can be modified, and after switching back to Premiere Pro, the clip will update with the changes.  Likewise, Premiere Pro projects can be imported into After Effects.  Clips can be copied between the two applications while preserving most clip attributes.  Premiere Pro also supports many After Effects plug-ins.

 Premiere Rush
Video projects in Premiere Rush can be opened in Premiere Pro to add more complex edits and views.

 Photoshop
 Adobe Photoshop files can be opened directly from Premiere Pro to be edited in Photoshop.  Any changes will immediately be updated when the Photoshop file is saved and focus returns to Premiere Pro.

 Illustrator
 Adobe Illustrator files can also be opened directly in Premiere Pro. These files are generally vector files, which means that they are mathematical paths that can expand or decrease with any zoom level.

 Adobe Story, OnLocation and Prelude
 The Premiere Pro workflow takes advantage of metadata in the script of video production. The script is created in or brought into Adobe Story, then passed to Adobe OnLocation to capture footage and attach any relevant metadata from the script to that footage.  Finally, in Premiere Pro, speech recognition can match the audio to the dialogue from the script in the metadata.  Clips can be searched based on their dialogue in Premiere Pro, and can be sent to Adobe Encore to make searchable web DVDs. Encore was discontinued with the release of Adobe Creative Cloud. Adobe Prelude replaces OnLocation in CS6 and above.

 Others
There are other integration functions, such as Edit in Adobe Audition, Dynamic Link to Encore, and Reveal in Adobe Bridge. In June 2020, Adobe launched a stock audio offering for Premiere Pro users.

 Extensions download free the premiere

Various extensions are available for Premiere Pro, provided by third parties. These include music libraries and graphic elements. Extensions open in their own panel within the Premiere Pro interface.

Adobe Premiere family 
The Adobe Premiere family is a group of applications and services made by Adobe Inc. for the use of professional non-linear video editing. Several features of the Adobe Premiere family are non-linear video editing, metadata and ingest logging, media output encoding, and more.

Current applications 

 Dynamic Link is a workflow that integrates After Effects with Premiere Pro and with the discontinued Encore, allowing files to be transferred between the two without re-rendering.
Elements Organizer is the digital asset management app for Photoshop Elements and Premiere Elements. It is able to organize all your photos and video projects all in one place.
Media Encoder is a tool to output video files in order support more audiences and to lessen the file size.
 Prelude is an ingest and logging tool for tagging media with metadata for searching, post-production workflows, and footage lifecycle management. Adobe Prelude is also made to work closely with Premiere Pro.
 Premiere Elements is a video editing software application published by Adobe Systems. It is a scaled-down version of Premiere Pro and is tailored to novice editors and consumers. The entry screen offers clip organization, editing and auto-movie generation options. Premiere Pro project files are not compatible with Premiere Elements projects files. Its main competitors are Final Cut Express (no longer sold), AVS Video Editor, PowerDirector, Pinnacle Studio, Sony Vegas Movie Studio, Sony Vegas, Corel VideoStudio, and iMovie. Unlike many of its competitors, Premiere Elements can handle unlimited video and audio tracks, with multiple keyframe effects applied to each clip, as well as picture-in-picture and chroma key capabilities. It also supports many third-party plug-ins for additional features, including Premiere Pro plug-ins, After Effects plug-ins, and VST effects. It can create bars and tone and a countdown leader, just like Premiere Pro. The program also features real-time video rendering which allows the user to instantly preview edits made to the video timeline. It is available for Windows and MacOS.
 Premiere Pro is a timeline-based video editing software application developed by Adobe Inc. and published as part of the Adobe Creative Cloud licensing program. First launched in 2003, Adobe Premiere Pro is a successor of Adobe Premiere (first launched in 1991).
 Premiere Rush is a simplified pro-quality video app for mobile devices, developed by Adobe and available through Creative Cloud. It replaced Premiere Clip as the mobile video editing application by Adobe Inc. today.

Discontinued applications 

 Encore (previously called Encore DVD) was a specialized DVD authoring app, which converts the output of Premiere Pro and After Effects to a format suitable for DVD and Blu-ray players. Files are automatically transcoded to MPEG-2 or H.264/MPEG-4 AVC video and Dolby Digital audio. It was discontinued along with Fireworks on CS6.
 OnLocation was a direct-to-disk recording and monitoring software. It was soon replaced by Prelude in Adobe Creative Suite 6.
 Premiere was a former video editing software developed by Adobe Systems. It was first launched in 1991, and its final version was released in 2002. It was replaced by Premiere Pro, a rewritten version of Adobe Premiere.
Premiere Clip was a timeline based video editing software on mobile platform. It is no longer supported for new and upcoming users since September 17, 2019. Extended support for all active customers lasted until March 17, 2020.
Premiere Express was a rich Internet application for simple editing of digital video files. The release was announced on February 21, 2007. The program itself is served as a free tool for users of YouTube, Photobucket, and MTV.com. As Adobe Systems allowed websites to contact them to request Express, YouTube received it on their website as a way of remixing videos on a member's YouTube account. It was later taken down.
Premiere Limited Edition (LE) was a video editor for novice video editors and hobbyists. It contains most of the features of the professional version but with fewer and simpler options. It was instead replaced by Premiere Elements in September 2004.
 SpeedGrade is a tool for performing color corrections and developing looks for Premiere projects. SpeedGrade was discontinued on August 22, 2017, but can still be used by subscribers at the time. Features from SpeedGrade are now found in the Lumetri Color Correction feature in Premiere Pro.
 Story was a screenwriting and film/TV pre-production online application which integrates with the Premiere family. It allows users to create scripts for movies and TV shows.
 Ultra is a discontinued chroma key compositing app, which removes the background of video usually recorded on a blue or green screen and combines it with another video background. Ultra was only available in the CS3 package. It was later incorporated into Premiere Elements and Visual Communicator. Later versions of Premiere Pro and After Effects have had built-in chroma key compositing features.
 Version Cue was a revision control system for maintaining multiple revisions of works among teams. It was removed from the Creative Suite after CS4.

Release history

Notable films edited on Adobe Premiere Pro 

 Act of Valor
 A Liar's Autobiography
 Avatar (daily and basic edits in conjunction with Avid Media Composer)
 Captain Abu Raed
 Deadpool
 Dust to Glory
 Evangelion: 3.0+1.0 Thrice Upon a Time
 Everything Everywhere All at Once
 Gone Girl
 Hugo (except VFX work)
 In a Heartbeat
 Monsters
 Red Obsession
 Sharknado 2: The Second One
 Staten Island Summer
 Superman Returns (for the video capture process)
 The Social Network (only conforming)
 Thunderbirds Are Go
 Ticket to Ride (by Warren Miller Entertainment)
 TimeScapes
 Waiting for Lightning
 Wayland's Song
 World War II from Space
 Nancy
 Terminator: Dark Fate

See also 

 Adobe Premiere Elements
 Adobe Premiere Express
 Adobe Creative Suite
 Creative Cloud controversy
 List of video editing software
 Comparison of video editing software

References

External links 
 

Premiere Pro
Premiere Pro
Video editing software
Video editing software for macOS
Video editing software for Windows
MacOS multimedia software